Dina Lebo Phalula (born 9 December 1983) is a South African long distance runner who specialises in the marathon. She competed in the women's marathon event at the 2016 Summer Olympics. She finished in 63rd place with a time of 2:41:46.

She has a twin sister who is also an athlete, the similarly named Lebogang Phalula.

She won the 1500 metres title at the 2005 South African Athletics Championships.

References

External links
 

1983 births
Living people
Place of birth missing (living people)
South African female long-distance runners
South African female marathon runners
Olympic female marathon runners
Olympic athletes of South Africa
Athletes (track and field) at the 2016 Summer Olympics
South African Athletics Championships winners
Twin sportspeople